The following is a list of some notable hotels in New York City.

Number of hotels
Most of the hotels are represented by the Hotel Association of New York City trade organization. As of 2016, the organization had 270 members, representing 75,000 rooms and 50,000 employees. Private hotels, such as the Yale Club, are members of the group.

More than half the hotels (114) are in Midtown Manhattan with 75 on the west side (most in the Times Square area) and 39 on the Midtown East Side. The city tourist list does not include single room occupancy hotels.

Largest hotels
Following is a list of the largest hotels in New York based on number of rentable rooms. Included in this lists is any hotel in the NYC area with at least 600 rooms.

The total room number includes suites. Some large hotels have been carved up into mixed use buildings in which the hotel occupies a portion of the building. This list includes only the hotel portion.

Hotels on the National Register of Historic Places

Hotels in the Historic Hotels of America

Former hotels

Grand Central Hotel
Hotel Pennsylvania
Hotel Vanderbilt
New York Biltmore Hotel
Stanhope Hotel
Marriott World Trade Center

References

External links
Official New York City tourist website
Ratings and availability of hotels in New York City

New York
Hotels
Hotels
Lists of hotels by city